The term companion weapon is used in historical European martial arts to refer to an item used in conjunction with the larger weapon in the non-sword hand while fencing with a rapier or sword. The popular companion weapon forms include:
sword and buckler
sword/rapier and parrying dagger
rapier and cloak

In most cases the off-hand weapon is used to deflect or parry.

See also
Daishō
Retiarius

Blade weapons